Programmable IC may refer to:
Programmable logic device or Programmable integrated circuit
Programmable Interrupt Controller

See also
PIC (disambiguation)